Area 1 Security, Inc. was an American cybersecurity company based in Redwood City, California which merged into Cloudflare in February 2022.

History
Area 1 was incorporated in 2013 by Oren Falkowitz, Blake Darché, and Phil Syme, previously employees of the U.S. National Security Agency. The company received venture capital financing led by Kleiner Perkins.

In December 2018, Area 1 identified a Chinese government cyber campaign targeting more than 100 intergovernmental organizations, ministries of foreign affairs, ministries of finance, trade unions, and think tanks, which included breach of the European Union diplomatic communications network.

In January 2020, Area 1 revealed a Russian government phishing campaign targeting Burisma Holdings and its subsidiaries.

In February 2022, Cloudflare announced plan to acquire Area 1 for $126 million in a cash and stock deal.

Service
Area 1 Horizon is a cloud-based service intended to mitigate phishing, ransomware, malware, watering holes, malvertising, and other social engineering threats, across email, web, and network, at the edge or in the cloud. The service is based on "a network of sensors on web servers around the globe, many known to be used by state-sponsored hackers."

Awards and recognition
Area 1 was named a Cool Vendor by Gartner in 2016, listed among "20 Rising Stars" of the Cloud 100 by Forbes and recognized by the San Francisco Business Times as a "Best Place to Work" in 2017, and named Google Cloud Global Technology Partner of the Year Award for Security in 2018.

In 2019, the Federal Election Commission ruled in AO 2019-12 that Area 1 could "offer its services to federal candidates and political committees at the same 'low or no cost' tier that it offers to all qualified customers without making an impermissible in-kind contribution".

References

External links
 

Software companies established in 2013
Companies based in Redwood City, California
American corporate subsidiaries